Lázaro Betancourt (born March 18, 1963) is a retired male triple jumper from Cuba. Best known for his silver medal at the 1985 IAAF World Indoor Championships, he also won the Central American and Caribbean Games twice. In June 1986 he achieved a personal best jump of 17.78 metres, which puts him 14th place in the all-time performers list. In the same year Betancourt was suspended after he failed a drug test.

Achievements

References

1963 births
Living people
Cuban male triple jumpers
Athletes (track and field) at the 1983 Pan American Games
Doping cases in athletics
Pan American Games medalists in athletics (track and field)
Pan American Games silver medalists for Cuba
Central American and Caribbean Games gold medalists for Cuba
Competitors at the 1982 Central American and Caribbean Games
Competitors at the 1986 Central American and Caribbean Games
Competitors at the 1990 Central American and Caribbean Games
World Athletics Indoor Championships medalists
Central American and Caribbean Games medalists in athletics
Medalists at the 1983 Pan American Games
Universiade medalists in athletics (track and field)
Universiade silver medalists for Cuba
20th-century Cuban people